Franz Fuchs (12 December 1949 – 26 February 2000) was an Austrian domestic terrorist who killed four people and injured 15, some seriously, using three improvised explosive devices and 24 mail bombs, which he sent in five waves between 1993 and 1997.

Criminal psychologists characterized Fuchs as a highly intelligent but socially inept loner. He targeted people he considered to be foreigners, or organizations and individuals whom he believed were "friendly to foreigners".

According to a study, Franz Fuchs inspired Pekka Eric-Auvien to kill 8 of his classmates during the Jokela school shooting in Finland in 2007.

Mail bombs and improvised explosive devices 
In December 1993 he started his first wave of mailbombs. Early victims were the priest August Janisch (because of his help for refugees), Silvana Meixner (ORF journalist for minorities), and the Mayor of Vienna, Helmut Zilk, who lost a large part of his left hand in the explosion. Other mailbombs which were discovered and neutralized were targeted at Helmut Schüller (humanitarian organisation Caritas), the Green politicians Madeleine Petrovic and Terezija Stoisits, Wolfgang Gombocz and Minister Johanna Dohnal.

While attempting to disarm an improvised explosive device found at a bilingual school in Carinthia, police officer Theo Kelz lost both his hands on 24 August 1994. (Kelz subsequently became the first Austrian to receive a double hand transplant, and made an impressive recovery.) 

Franz Fuchs claimed responsibility for his attacks in a letter to the foreign minister of Slovenia in September 1994, in the name of the "Salzburger Eidgenossenschaft – Bajuwarische Befreiungsarmee" (Bavarian Liberation Army). In a number of subsequent letters, he tried to give the impression of a larger organisation with different units. However, from the second wave of mailbombs in October 1994 not a single one went off.

Oberwart attack on Roma
On 5 February 1995, four Romani were killed in Oberwart with a pipe bomb improvised explosive device which was attached to a sign that read "Roma zurück nach Indien" ("Romani back to India"). It was the worst racial terror attack in post-war Austria, and was Fuchs's first fatal attack. The bomb was set to explode at chest-height when someone touched the placard with the message.

The next day in nearby Stinatz, mainly populated by Austrians of Croatian descent, a bomb with a pamphlet "Go back to Dalmatia" wounded a garbage worker.

Between June 1995 and December 1995 he sent three more waves of mailbombs. Wave number three was targeted at TV host Arabella Kiesbauer, Dietrich Szameit (vice-mayor of Lübeck) and a dating agency. Kiesbauer and Szameit did not open their letters themselves and were not hurt. Wave number four was targeted at two medics and a refugee aid worker, Maria Loley. One medic from Syria and Maria Loley were injured; the other mailbomb, targeted at a South Korean medic was discovered and neutralized. Two mailbombs of wave number five detonated early in mailboxes, the remaining two were discovered and neutralized. This was the last incident before Fuchs was arrested.

Arrest, trial and death 

At this stage Fuchs had become highly paranoid. On 1 October 1997 near his residence in Gralla, he followed two women in a car who he believed were observing him. When police attempted to question him on what they believed was a routine case of stalking, he produced another improvised explosive device which he had kept in his car, and detonated it in his hands in front of the policemen. His suicide attempt failed, but he lost both hands, and also injured a nearby police officer. Fuchs was arrested without giving further resistance and, after a trial which many in Austria felt had fallen short of making all attempts to uncover deep details, was sentenced to life in prison on 10 March 1999. Through his unruly behavior during the trial, Fuchs had repeatedly forced his removal from court proceedings.

On 26 February 2000, Fuchs was found hanged with the cable of his electric razor in his prison cell at Graz-Karlau Prison. The prison physician determined his death to be a suicide.

Unresolved questions 
Although the case was officially closed after Fuchs had been sentenced, and although the "Bavarian Liberation Army" was determined to never have existed as a terrorist organization in the meaning of the term, doubts remained whether Fuchs had actually committed his actions without any support or tacit knowledge from sympathizers.

A thorough search of the two rooms in his parents' house where Fuchs had lived revealed more improvised explosive devices but no traces of the equipment which he would have needed to produce and handle the unstable explosives (including mercury fulminate and nitroglycerol) contained in his improvised explosive devices.

Most of Fuchs' "confession letters" exhibited an aptitude at verbal expression for which he was not known. Some had referred to internal affairs in police procedures that were not accessible to the general public.

Even more doubts remain concerning Fuchs' death. How exactly a man without hands (Fuchs consistently refused having his advanced prosthetic arms fitted to him) and under almost constant video surveillance could accomplish the manipulations required to convert an electric cable into a noose sufficiently robust for suicide by hanging was never properly explained.

Media 
In 2007, the criminal case was portrayed in the docudrama Franz Fuchs – Ein Patriot, the role of Franz Fuchs was played by Austrian Karl Markovics.
In the computer games Hitman: Codename 47 and Hitman: Contracts, the character Frantz Fuchs appears to be based on Franz. Frantz is an Austrian terrorist, who served in Hitlerjugend as a youngster, and is planning to blow up a hotel at which a U.N. peace summit is being held.

References 

1949 births
1993 murders in Austria
1995 murders in Austria
2000 suicides
Anti-black racism in Europe
Anti-Croat sentiment
Anti-South Korean sentiment
Antiziganism in Europe
Anti-Arabism in Europe
Austrian amputees
Austrian mass murderers
Austrian neo-Nazis
Austrian people convicted of murder
Austrian people who died in prison custody
Austrian prisoners sentenced to life imprisonment
Bombers (people)
February 1995 events in Europe
Hate crimes
Mass murder in 1995
Murderers who committed suicide in prison custody
People convicted of murder by Austria
People from Leibnitz District
Prisoners sentenced to life imprisonment by Austria
Prisoners who died in Austrian detention
Racism in Austria
Suicides by hanging in Austria
Terrorist incidents in Europe in 1995
Terrorist incidents in Austria
Xenophobia in Europe
Serial bombers